Yunnanilus parvus is a species of ray-finned fish, a stone loach, in the genus Yunnanilus. The type locality of this species is given as Nan Tong, in Kaihuan County, Yunnan, China. However, when research was carried out to find these locations it was not possible to find the precise location of either place. It was described as being found in a cave outlet and feeding on detritus.

References

P
Taxa named by Maurice Kottelat
Taxa named by Chu Xin-Luo
Fish described in 1988